In Mormonism, the oath of vengeance (or law of vengeance) was part of the endowment ritual of the Church of Jesus Christ of Latter-day Saints (LDS Church). Participants swore an oath to pray for God to avenge the blood of prophets Joseph Smith and Hyrum Smith, who were assassinated in 1844. The oath was part of the ceremony from about 1845 until the early 1930s.

The officiant of the ritual enjoined the participants as follows: "You and each of you do covenant and promise that you will pray and never cease to pray to Almighty God to avenge the blood of the prophets upon this nation, and that you will teach the same to your children and to your children's children unto the third and fourth generation."

Incorporation into the Nauvoo endowment
The oath of vengeance was an addition made to the Nauvoo endowment under the direction of Brigham Young by 1845 in the Nauvoo Temple, soon after the 1844 death of Joseph Smith. Participants agreed to be bound by the following oath:

You and each of you do covenant and promise that you will pray and never cease to pray to Almighty God to avenge the blood of the prophets upon this nation, and that you will teach the same to your children and to your children's children unto the third and fourth generation.

The prophets referred to are Joseph and Hyrum Smith, who were killed by a mob in 1844 while jailed in Carthage, Illinois. The nation referred is the United States.

The oath entered the endowment when many Mormons yearned for retribution for the murder of their church's founders. At least one member felt the oath to include a personal obligation that "if he had ever met any of those who had taken a hand in that massacre he would undoubtedly have attempted to avenge the blood of the martyrs." However, members understood the oath to require only prayer.

The prayer to which endowed members obligated themselves took place in at least some cases as part of the prayer circle ceremony, which was also part of the endowment but was often performed separately.

Doctrinal basis
Blood atonement is the idea that spilled blood "cries out" for retribution and finds several examples in Mormon scripture as well as numerous references in the speeches and writings of early LDS Church leaders. In the Bible, for example, the blood of Abel ascended to the ears of God after he was killed by Cain (Genesis 4:10). In the Book of Mormon, the "blood of a righteous man" (Gideon) was said to "come upon" the theocratic leader Alma "for vengeance" against the murderer (Nehor) (Alma 1:13). Mormon scripture also refers to the "cry" of the blood of the saints ascending from the ground up to the ears of God as a testimony against those who killed them (2 Nephi 26: 3; D&C 88:6).

According to Brigham Young, it was inevitable that Joseph Smith's blood, and the blood of all martyrs to the faith, would be "atoned for" in "His own due time". Their blood, he said, was "under the altar" and "crying to God, day and night, for vengeance". Young was the most prolific author of speeches referencing blood atonement; his most direct speech stated that a person who "has committed a sin that he knows will deprive him of that exaltation which he desires, and that he cannot attain to it without the shedding of his blood, and also knows that by having his blood shed he will atone for that sin, and be saved and exalted with the Gods, is there a man or woman in this house but what would say, 'shed my blood that I may be saved and exalted with the Gods?' All mankind love themselves, and let these principles be known by an individual, and he would be glad to have his blood shed. That would be loving themselves, even unto an eternal exaltation. Will you love your brothers or sisters likewise, when they have committed a sin that cannot be atoned for without the shedding of their blood? Will you love that man or woman well enough to shed their blood? That is what Jesus Christ meant."

The oath of vengeance was referenced by John D. Lee in his confession of his involvement in the Mountain Meadows massacre. Lee stated, "I believed then as I do now, that it was the will of every true Mormon in Utah, at that time, that the enemies of the Church should be killed as fast as possible, and that as this lot of people had men amongst them that were supposed to have helped kill the Prophets in the Carthage jail, the killing of all of them would be keeping our oaths and avenging the blood of the Prophets." After the events of the massacre became known to the U.S. government, Lee was the only man out of the dozens of participants who was executed by Utah's territorial government. In keeping with Mormon beliefs about blood atonement, Lee was executed by firing squad. Until 2004, Utah's capital punishment laws allowed the condemned to choose execution by firing squad.

Removal from Endowment

Beginning in 1919, LDS Church president Heber J. Grant appointed a committee charged with revising the endowment ceremony, which was done under the direction of apostle George F. Richards from 1921 to 1929. Richards revised the ceremony to eliminate the oath of vengeance, and the revision was formally implemented in the early 1930s.

Eyewitness accounts
Heber C. Kimball, a member of the Quorum of the Twelve Apostles of the LDS Church, described the oath of vengeance in his diary on December 21, 1845.

Increase and Maria Van Duesen, a married couple, describe their participation in the oath of vengeance in the Nauvoo Temple on January 29, 1846.

Ann Eliza Young, former wife of LDS Church president Brigham Young, described, in her autobiography, her experience taking the oath of vengeance.

A woman known only as "Mrs G.H.R." attended an endowment ceremony in September 1879 in Salt Lake City, Utah Territory. She provided the information for a Salt Lake Tribune article detailing the endowment ceremony. In it, she described the oath of vengeance.

In 1889, several members of the LDS Church that had emigrated from other countries applied for citizenship to the United States. Their loyalty to the United States was called into question due to rumors of oaths taken during the endowment ceremony. The following testimonies are found in the transcripts of those court proceedings.

Abraham H. Cannon, a member of the Quorum of the Twelve Apostles of the LDS Church, wrote in his diary, December 6, 1889, the description his father, apostle George Q. Cannon gave of the oath of vengeance.

During the Reed Smoot hearings, December 1904, in sworn testimony in front of the United States Senate, several witnesses described the oath of vengeance.

Relation to other Mormon "blood" doctrines

Because LDS Church members are advised against speaking in detail about the rituals of the temple, there are few records regarding interrelated doctrines and rituals once they have been altered or removed. Blood atonement is usually a more general concept, with specific temple rituals such as the oath of vengeance and "blood oaths" or "penalties" acting as specific applications of blood atonement.

The blood oaths in the LDS Church temple ceremony, which were discontinued church-wide in 1990, depicted a willingness to have one's throat cut from ear to ear should the participant reveal certain portions of the sacred rituals or fail to keep promises given during the washing and anointing ordinances.

The oath of vengeance is related to blood atonement in that both require capital punishment for sins regarded as unusually heinous. In early Mormonism, repentance for crimes such as murder or adultery, where restitution is not possible, involved personal sacrifice in order to make redemption possible through the atonement of Jesus Christ. Blood atonement was preached as a method of personal redemption, preferably voluntary, that could reinstate the possibility of salvation.

Notes

References

.
.
.
.
.
.
.
.
.
.
.
.
.

1845 establishments in Illinois
1845 in Christianity
History of the Church of Jesus Christ of Latter-day Saints
Latter Day Saint temple practices
Mormonism and violence
Religious oaths
Mormonism and politics